Paul Taisuke Narui, S.V.D. is the new bishop elect of the Roman Catholic Diocese of Niigata, Japan.

Early life 
Narui was born on 24 November 1973 in Iwakura, Japan.

Priesthood 
Narui joined Society of the Divine Word on 1986 and was ordained a priest on 10 March 2001. He obtained a bachelor's degree from Nanzan University.

Episcopate 
On 31 May 2020, Pope Francis appointed Narui as bishop of the Roman Catholic Diocese of Niigata, Japan. He was consecrated on 22 September 2020 by Tarcisio Isao Kikuchi.

References

External links 

Living people
1973 births
People from Iwakura, Aichi
Divine Word Missionaries Order
21st-century Roman Catholic bishops in Japan
Bishops appointed by Pope Francis
Japanese Roman Catholic bishops